Hardwired is a 2009 American science fiction action film directed by Ernie Barbarash, written by Mike Hurst, and starring Cuba Gooding Jr. and Val Kilmer. The film was released on direct-to-DVD in the United States on November 3, 2009.

Plot
In the not-too-distant future where corporations control nearly every aspect of human life, a man named Luke Gibson is involved in a car accident that claims the life of his wife and their unborn child. Luke has severe brain damage, but Hope Corporation agrees to implant a chip into his brain to save his life. He discovers that this chip also constantly sends advertisements until either the person obtains the product, or they go insane. While trying to figure out why they did this to him and who he is, he finds out that the chip is a test product with a fail-safe that could kill him. He succumbs to the effects but the Corporation fears that their test might be discovered, and they decide to activate the fail-safe. Just before it goes off, a group of underground hackers led by Hal and "Keyboard" hack into the chip and save his life. After using the chip to guide him away from Hope Corp. pursuers, they agree to try to help him remember who he is in exchange for assisting in their fight against Hope Corp. They show him that his accident was no accident but actually planned by Hope Corp. so they could use him as a test subject. He agrees to help but is captured during the attempt and taken to a facility controlled by Hope Corp. Luke, with the help of Punk Red and Punk Blue, manages to fight his way to the leader of the project, Virgil Kirkhill. Virgil is killed after a short confrontation, and Luke escapes. He meets up with "Red" and "Blue" (the only remaining members of the underground group). Together they vow to continue the fight until Hope Corporation is destroyed.

Cast
 Cuba Gooding Jr. as Luke Gibson
 Val Kilmer as Virgil Kirkhill
 Michael Ironside as Hal
 Tatiana Maslany as Punk Red
 Eric Breker as Robert Drake
 Juan Riedinger as Punk Blue
 Chad Krowchuk as Keyboard
 Terry Chen as Carter Burke
 Hiro Kanagawa as Dr. Steckler
 Rachel Luttrell as Candace
 Donny Lucas as Bennett
 Ali Liebert as Catalina Jones
 Monica Mustelier as Veronica "Ronnie" Gibson
 Julius Chapple as Lewis
 Sunita Prasad as Nurse Price
 Lance Henriksen as Hope (Uncredited: Henriksen appears only in a still frame at the end of the film and the still is taken from an episode of the television show Millennium.)

Production 
Ironside was originally offered Kilmer's role, Virgil Kirkhill, but he declined, as he wanted to stretch his acting beyond playing imposing antagonists. Ironside said that he was originally drawn to the script based on the Matrix-style themes.

Reception
David Nusair of ReelFilm panned the film, stating, "Hardwired inevitably establishes itself as just another sloppy, run-of-the-mill direct-to-video actioner – with Cuba Gooding Jr's presence in the central role ultimately more sad than anything else." Scifi Movie Page also negatively reviewed the movie, writing that "Hardwired is cheesy, seriously cheesy."  Steve Power of DVD Verdict wrote, "Amazingly, Hardwired isn't completely terrible."

References

External links
 
 

2009 films
2009 science fiction action films
American science fiction action films
Cyberpunk films
Films about advertising
Films about computing
American films about revenge
Films set in British Columbia
Films set in the future
Films shot in Vancouver
Holography in films
Films directed by Ernie Barbarash
2000s English-language films
2000s American films